Lautersee is a lake in Oberbayern, Bavaria, Germany. At an elevation of 1013 m, its surface area is 0.146 km². It is situated on the southern slope of the Hoher Kranzberg above Mittenwald.

Lakes of Bavaria